N86 may refer to:
 Escadrille N.86, a unit of the French Air Force
 , a submarine of the Royal Navy
 London Buses route N86
 N86 road (Ireland)
 Nokia N86 8MP, a smartphone
 Spanish Springs Airport, in Washoe County, Nevada, United States
 Volvo N86, a Swedish truck